The Bilan d'aptitude délivré par les grandes écoles (BADGE, in English Assessment of competency issued by grandes écoles) is a French degree created in 2001 by the Conférence des Grandes Écoles and primarily intended for owners of a two-year degree after the Baccalauréat.

Presentation 

According to the rules of organization of training programs accredited by the Conférence des Grandes Écoles , ""The BADGE ... of the School... " is a registered collective ownership of the Conférence des Grandes Écoles, attributed to a specific training organized by a school member of the CGE. It is intended primarily for owners of a two-year degree after the Baccalauréat'".

Be considered applicants who hold one of the following qualifications:
 Two-year degree after the Baccalauréat;
  Baccalauréat'' and a significant professional experience relevant to the subject of the application of at least five years.

The BADGE program necessarily includes a number of common elements: at least 200 hours of instruction, including theoretical, practical work, team projects and possibly distance learning and a final validation test.
The program takes place over a period of 7 weeks to 24 months maximum, subject to alternating training / business where the period exceeds 6 months and is 15 to 25 ECTS-credits.

References

External links 
 BADGE on Conférence des grandes écoles website

Management education
Higher education in France
Academic degrees of France